Pavel Mareš (born 20 January 1943) is a former speedway rider from the Czech Republic.

Speedway career
Mareš won the silver medal in the 1965 Czechoslovakian Individual Speedway Championship. He also partnered Václav Verner to the World Pairs final at the 1971 Speedway World Pairs Championship.

World Final appearances

World Pairs Championship
 1971 -  Rybnik, Rybnik Municipal Stadium (with Václav Verner) - 4th - 17pts (8)

References

1948 births
Living people
Czech speedway riders